Costanza d'Avalos Piccolomini (born 1560) was  a duchess of Amalfi. A lady of great worth, she cultivated Italian poetry with great success. Charles V gave her the title of princess, as a mark of his esteem. Her poems have been published several times with those of Victoria Colonna, her cousin; there are several of her pieces also in the collection by Ludovico Domenichi (Lucca, 1559, 8vo; and Naples, 1595).

In later years she moved to the convent of Santa Chiara a Napoli, where she died.

References

1560 deaths
Italian duchesses
Italian women poets
Costanza
Costanza
Year of birth unknown
16th-century Italian women writers